Nymboi-Binderay is a national park located in New South Wales, Australia,  north of Sydney. It is located north of the town of Dorrigo.

This park surrounds the granite gorges and banks of the rugged Nymboida River. The Nymboida rapids are used by white water rafters. The park also contains sections of the Little Nymboida River and recreational areas at Cod Hole and The Junction. Rainforest and extensive old growth forest provide habitat for a variety of threatened fauna,  including 68 species of mammals, 33 species of reptiles, 25 species of amphibians and over 120 species of birds.

It includes patches of the rare Dorrigo white gum.

See also
 Protected areas of New South Wales
 High Conservation Value Old Growth forest

External links
Nymboi-Binderay National Park

References 

National parks of New South Wales
Protected areas established in 1997
1997 establishments in Australia